Elbow Lake is the name of some places in the U.S. state of Minnesota:
Elbow Lake, Becker County, Minnesota
Elbow Lake, Grant County, Minnesota